The Tusk is a sharply pointed peak of white marble, about 460 m high, in the east part of Mayer Crags. It stands 1.5 nautical miles (2.8 km) south of Mount Henson at the west side of the terminus of Liv Glacier. The peak's descriptive name was given by the Southern Party of the New Zealand Geological Survey Antarctic Expedition (NZGSAE), 1963–64.

Mountains of the Ross Dependency
Dufek Coast